(born April 8, 1939) is a former Japanese baseball player. He played for the Hanshin Tigers from 1962 to 1973.

References

1939 births
Living people
Japanese baseball players
Hanshin Tigers players
Managers of baseball teams in Japan
Hanshin Tigers managers
Place of birth missing (living people)
Keio University alumni
20th-century Japanese people